Jewish Communist Youth Union (Evreĭskiĭ kommunisticheskiĭ soiuz molodezhi, abbreviated EKSM or Евкоммол, Evkommol) was the youth wing of the Jewish Communist Party (Poalei Zion) in Russia. The first All-Russian convention of the organization took place 23–27 January 1920 in Moscow. The All-Russian conference of the organization took place 1–4 September 1920 in Kharkov.

The organization published Evkommol ('Евкоммол').

Evkommol fiercely opposed the Yevsektsiya, the Jewish Section of the Russian Communist Party (Bolsheviks).

References

Poale Zion
Youth wings of communist parties
Jewish political parties
Jews and Judaism in the Soviet Union
Jewish communist movements
Secular Jewish culture in Europe